Bredicot is a small village and civil parish in Worcestershire, England, about  east of Worcester.

It was formerly (as described in 1868) in the hundred of Oswaldslow. In the 11th century the name was Bradingecotan or Bradigcotan.

Church
The Church of St James the Less is a Grade II listed building. The building dates from about 1300, and was restored by A. E. Perkins in 1843.

Bredicot Court Manor House

The earliest mention of the manor of Bredicot is in 985, by which time it had been acquired by the church of Worcester, when Bishop Oswald granted the vill to a priest named Goding.

Bredicot Court Farmhouse, Grade II-listed, was built in the early 17th century. It has an H-shaped plan, and is timber-framed with brick infilling; there is an 18th-century brick wing. Also in the village are Court Cottages, timber-framed buildings of the 16th or 17th century, Grade II-listed.

References

Villages in Worcestershire
Wychavon
Civil parishes in Worcestershire